HMS Lady Shirley (T464), also known as HMT Lady Shirley, was a fishing trawler requisitioned by the Royal Navy in 1940 and converted for anti-submarine warfare duties. She sank  on 4October 1941, capturing 44 of her crew.

Description
Lady Shirley was a fishing trawler of 472 tons displacement based at Hull. She was built at Beverley in the UK by Cook, Welton & Gemmell and launched in 1937.

Service record
She was pressed into service by the Royal Navy in 1940 and converted into an anti-submarine trawler. Conversion included fitting an ASDIC anti-submarine dome, a 4-inch naval gun and depth charges. She had a complement of 33.  Lady Shirley went into service in January 1941 and served with the 31st Anti-Submarine Group based at Gibraltar. She was under the command of Lieutenant-Commander Arthur Henry Callaway.

Sinking of U-111
On 4 October 1941, while searching for the damaged Silverbelle, Lady Shirley encountered  engaged in a similar mission south-west of Tenerife, at position . Mistaking the trawler for the damaged freighter (though Lady Shirley was small, the U-boat skipper thought she was far away) the U-boat was caught at periscope depth when Lady Shirley closed, and was depth charged. Forced to the surface, U-111 was engaged with gunfire until she was abandoned and sunk.
Of the U-boat crew of 52, eight were killed, including her commander, Wilhelm Kleinschmidt; 44 survived. Lady Shirley had one crew member killed and several injured in the battle. This was the first time that prisoners of war (POWs) were captured from a U-boat operating in the South Atlantic. German survivors claimed that U-111 was the first U-boat to be lost of those operating in that area.

Loss
On 11December 1941, a torpedo from  hit Lady Shirley, sinking her in the Straits of Gibraltar at position . All 33 crew were lost with their ship.

References

External links
 U 111 versus Lady Shirley 

 

Anti-submarine trawlers of the Royal Navy
Protected Wrecks of the United Kingdom
1937 ships
Maritime incidents in December 1941
World War II shipwrecks in the Mediterranean Sea
Ships sunk by German submarines in World War II